Consort Qi may refer to:

Consorts with the surname Qi
Consort Qi (Han dynasty) (224–194 BC), concubine of Emperor Gaozu of Han
Empress Qi ( 412), wife of Yao Xing (Emperor Wenhuan of Later Qin)

Consorts with the title Consort Qi
Consort Qi (Yongzheng) (1676–1739), concubine of the Yongzheng Emperor
Imperial Noble Consort Duanke (1844–1910), concubine of the Xianfeng Emperor

See also
Empress Gi (1315–1369), empress of Toghon Temür of the Yuan dynasty, Gi is pronounced Qi in Chinese